Amy Lee is an American saxophonist, composer and arranger. She has played with a variety of musicians and singers, and is best known for being a member of Jimmy Buffett's Coral Reefer Band.

Early life and education 
Lee was born in North Adams, Massachusetts and studied music at the University of Miami. After graduating, she moved to Atlanta.

Career 
While living in Atlanta, Lee met Charles Neville of the Neville Brothers and began playing for his group Diversity at the New Orleans Jazz and Heritage Festival. Her first album performance was in 1990 on Richard Smallwood's Portrait. After playing with Diversity for six years at the Festival, Lee was introduced to Jimmy Buffett by Neville, and in 1991, she joined Buffett's Coral Reefer Band, where she recorded and toured until 2006. During her career, Lee has recorded for gospel singer Luther Barnes and rap group Y'all So Stupid. She has also acted as a performer, arranger and writer for radio and television commercials.

Lee released her first solo album in 1999, a jazz record titled Inside the Outside. A second album, Use Me, was released in 2004. All of her solo music is released on her independent label Publick Ptomaine Music.

Discography
1999: Inside the Outside
2004: Use Me

References

American jazz tenor saxophonists
Smooth jazz saxophonists
University of Miami Frost School of Music alumni
Living people
Year of birth missing (living people)
People from North Adams, Massachusetts
Coral Reefer Band members
21st-century American saxophonists
Women jazz saxophonists
20th-century American saxophonists
20th-century American women musicians
21st-century American women musicians
Jazz musicians from Massachusetts